Kamathep Ork Suek (  lit. "Battle of Love") is a Thai lakorn, the second drama in the series The Cupids, based on a novel series of the same name. It was aired every Friday–Sunday from March 25 until April 8, 2017.

Synopsis
Horm Meun Lee (Cris Horwang), one of the "Cupid Hut" employees. She is very self-conscious without make-up because back in college other students told her that she look like a "Ju-On" ghost. Pee, a taxi driver who helps Horm Meun Lee one night after she escapes from a guy. Since then the two becomes close, Pee became Horm personal driver. Even her friends thought Pee was a great guy and that she could ask him out on a date. But Horm feels like Pee is hiding something from her. Who is Pee? Is he just a taxi diver?

Cast

Main
Cris Horwang as Horm Meun Lee
 as Pee Mongkol

Supporting
 as Podduang / Din
 as Angie
Mintita Wattanakul as Cindy
 as Man / Minnie
Benjawan Artner as Max Magnolia
Lilly McGrath as Bell
Daraneenuch Photipiti as Pee Mongkol's mom 
 as Bpraat, Pee Mongkol's dad
 as Horm Meun Lee's mom

Guest
Theeradej Wongpuapan as Peem
Araya A. Hargate as Waralee
Jarinporn Joonkiat as Hunsa
Pakorn Chatborirak as Tim Pitchayatorn
Pichukkana Wongsarattanasin as Praweprao
Phupoom Pongpanu as Rome
Thikamporn Ritta-apinan as Oil / Nantisa
Kannarun Wongkajornklai as Prima
 as Lieutenant Pratchawin
Amelia Jacobs as Suay
 as Ben
 as Huiysoi (Hunsa’s father)
Oak Keerati

Original Soundtrack

References

External links 
 Ch3 Thailand Official Website
 Ch3 Thailand Official YouTube

2010s Thai television series
Thai drama television series
2017 Thai television series debuts
2017 Thai television series endings
Thai romance television series
Thai television soap operas
Channel 3 (Thailand) original programming
Television series by Broadcast Thai Television